Amelia Warner (born Amelia Catherine Bennett; 4 June 1982) is an English musician, composer, and former actress.

Early life
Warner was born Amelia Catherine Bennett in Birkenhead, Merseyside, the only child of actors Annette Ekblom and Alun Lewis. Her paternal uncle is actor Hywel Bennett.

Career
Warner started her acting career as a member of the Royal Court's youth theatre group. She also starred in a 2000 BBC adaptation of Lorna Doone and has had supporting roles in films such as Æon Flux and Stoned.

In 2015, she self-released a classical instrumental EP, titled Arms. In 2016, Amelia began scoring films starting with Mum's List followed by Mary Shelley. In 2017, she released her second EP titled Visitors under her name, Amelia Warner.

In 2018, Amelia Warner won the International Film Music Critics Association Award for Breakthrough Composer of the Year for her debut mainstream score on the film, Mary Shelley.

On 28 September 2020, Fearne Cotton announced that she was releasing "Happy Place", the album which features music from an array of artists that focus around mental health and well-being. The first single which was released on the same day as the announcement is the song "Lockdown Kittens Dancing" which features music by Amelia Warner which is taken from her song "For Love" off her "Haven" EP released in June 2020. In the same year she was invited to the  Academy of Motion Picture Arts and Sciences.

Slow Moving Millie
Warner began her music career in July 2009, when she wrote and performed the song "Beasts" under the name Slow Moving Millie for a Virgin Media television commercial. The track was then released on 17 August 2009. Her second single, "Rewind City" was also used for another advertisement, for Orange UK, and was directed by Ringan Ledwidge. In October 2011, Warner signed a record deal with Island Records. Her cover version of the Smiths' 1984 B-Side "Please, Please, Please, Let Me Get What I Want" was released on 11 November 2011 and was selected as the soundtrack to the John Lewis 2011 Christmas advertisement. Since releasing her album, Renditions, she also composed music for adverts and short films. Her first major score was for the British short, Mam. Soon after, Warner released her Fyfe Dangerfield-produced EP, Arms, under Universal Music. Her second EP, Visitors. In 2016, she scored her first feature-length film, Mum's List, followed by score to the movie Mary Shelley.

Personal life
Warner married Colin Farrell in a non-legal ceremony in 2001; they ended the relationship four months later. She married Jamie Dornan in 2013. She has three daughters.

Discography

Composer credits

Albums

Singles

Filmography

Awards and nominations

References

External links
 
 

1982 births
Actresses from Merseyside
Alumni of Goldsmiths, University of London
English film actresses
English television actresses
English people of Welsh descent
Living people
People educated at the Royal Masonic School
People educated at Fine Arts College
21st-century English women singers
21st-century English singers